Balui River is a river in Sarawak, Malaysia. It is a tributary of the Rajang River. The 2,400 megawatt Bakun hydroelectric dam is located on the river.

See also
 List of rivers of Malaysia

References

Rivers of Sarawak
Rivers of Malaysia